Jessui Silva do Nascimento (born July 20, 1982 in Beberibe) is a Brazilian former footballer who played as a striker. He had two experiences outside Brazil playing in Portugal for Primeira Liga club União Leiria and in Romania for Liga I club Pandurii Târgu Jiu.

References

External links

1982 births
Living people
Brazilian footballers
Brazilian expatriate footballers
Expatriate footballers in Portugal
Primeira Liga players
Expatriate footballers in Romania
Liga I players
U.D. Leiria players
CS Pandurii Târgu Jiu players
Association football forwards
Fortaleza Esporte Clube players
Sportspeople from Ceará